is a Japanese direct-to-video horror film released in 1990 by the Bandai Media Division (now Bandai Visual). It's the sequel of the film Nagai Go no Kowai Zone: Kaiki and just like the first film, it was also directed Go Nagai and Hikari Hayakawa. This is one of several films where Japanese manga artist Ippongi Bang plays a role.

External links
Nagai Go no Kowai Zone 2: Senki  at allcinema
Nagai Go no Kowai Zone 2: Senki  at the Japanese Movie Database

Go Nagai
1990s Japanese-language films
1990 horror films
1990 films
1990s Japanese films